Sakadas (roughly "imported ones") is a term for migrant workers in and from the Philippines, doing manual agricultural labor. Within the Philippines, sakadas work in provinces other than their own. In the 20th century, Filipino men were imported by the Hawaiian Sugar Planters' Association to Hawaii as "skilled laborers" from 1906 to 1946 mainly from the Ilocos region of the Philippines.

History 
The Hawaiian Sugar Planters' Association approved a plan to recruit labor from the Philippines in April 1906 and asked Albert F. Judd to represent them.

See also 

History of Filipino Americans
Manong generation

Nicholas Loney

References

Further reading

External links 
 Filipino History in Hawaii before 1946: The Sakada Years of Filipinos in Hawaii
 The Filipino Century Beyond Hawaii: A report
 Filipino Workers in Hawaii, 1926 Photographs in Connection with the Investigation of Working Conditions of Filipino Laborers on Hawaiian Sugar Plantations, 1926

History of Antique (province)
History of Ilocos Sur
History of Negros Occidental
History of Negros Oriental
Filipino-American history
Filipino-American culture in Hawaii